Buca di Beppo is an American restaurant chain specializing in Italian-American food.  The name roughly translates as "Joe's small place" from Italian (buca, which literally means "hole" or "pit", can be a dialectal word in Tuscany for a small room or place, and Beppo is a diminutive of the name Giuseppe). The chain of 81 establishments  (76 company-owned, 5 franchises in UK)  is owned by Buca, Inc., which is also owned by Planet Hollywood.

The chain is known for its vintage photographs hung closely spaced throughout the restaurant.

Menu

The food at Buca di Beppo is served family style, each item served à la carte and shared among the dining party. Some locations also have a lunch menu, featuring individual-sized portions.  Each room at Buca is themed, and all restaurants have a Pope table—the largest single table, round, in a room by itself, with a bust of the Pope as centerpiece.

In an attempt to boost sales during 2005, Buca introduced a Buca Mia menu, meaning "My Cellar", with less-expensive portions for two.

Corporate history
Phil Roberts founded Buca di Beppo in 1993 as an imitation of "red sauce joints", Italian-American family restaurants in the northeast United States. Not Italian himself, Roberts wanted his restaurant's stereotypical depiction of Italian-American culture to be "intentionally in bad taste, but good-natured bad taste". He hired Vittorio Renda, a Milanese chef, and Roberts's architect son decorated the restaurant with Italians' family photographs from flea markets. In 1996, a new CEO, Joseph Micatrotto, brought less exaggerated Italian-American cultural depictions, based on his family's history, to the chain as it prepared to go public.

The first restaurant, named Buca Little Italy, was opened in the basement level of a Minneapolis apartment building in 1993 by Twin Cities restaurant company Parasole Restaurant Holdings. Five years later, it was spun off and renamed Buca di Beppo. By 1999, there were 20 locations when Buca, Inc. began trading on the NASDAQ stock exchange.

The chain continued to grow, but began to hit some rough spots a few years later. Business losses mounted, and in 2005, the U.S. Securities and Exchange Commission began investigating the company over securities laws. Two top executives left the company, three Buca di Beppo sites were closed, and the company described those restaurants and the Vinny T's chain as "discontinued operations" in fourth quarter 2005 earnings statements.

However, on May 22, 2006, the company announced that it would be keeping the Vinny T's stores, but converting them to Buca di Beppo locations. On September 25, 2006, Buca, Inc. sold their 11 Vinny T's of Boston restaurants to Bertucci's Corp. for $6.8 million.

On June 7, 2006, Micatrotto and two other former Buca executives were charged with stealing more than US$200,000 from the company.

On August 5, 2008, Planet Hollywood's parent company, Planet Hollywood International, Inc., agreed to purchase the Buca chain for US$28.5 million.  Under terms of the deal, Buca became a wholly owned subsidiary of Planet Hollywood. Its founder, Robert Earl, restored Buca di Beppo's gaudy decor of photographs covering walls.

In 2011, Buca moved its headquarters from Minneapolis to Orlando, Florida, home of its parent company, citing financial incentives.  In 2012, Rick Tasman was named CEO & President. In 2015, Rich Saultz was named the new CEO & President and is currently in that position.

By 2016, the company had 100 locations in the U.S. and U.K.

, the chain has 77 restaurants in 24 states; Honolulu is the highest-grossing location. In 2019, Earl Enterprises announced that a point-of-sale credit card breach affected credit-card users who visited Buca (or other Earl Enterprise-owned restaurants) between May 23, 2018, and March 18, 2019.

See also
 List of Italian restaurants

References

External links

 - United States
 - United Kingdom

Companies based in Orlando, Florida
Restaurant chains in the United States
Restaurants established in 1993
1993 establishments in Minnesota
American companies established in 1993
2008 mergers and acquisitions
Italian restaurants in the United States